Gongs East! is an album by drummer and bandleader Chico Hamilton's Quintet. It was recorded in 1958 and released on the Warner Bros. label. the album features some of the earliest recordings of Eric Dolphy.

Reception

The AllMusic review by Scott Yanow states: "Dolphy has quite a few short solos on this rewarding music... Recommended."

Track listing
 "Beyond the Blue Horizon" (Richard A. Whiting, W. Franke Harling, Leo Robin) - 2:59
 "Where I Live" (Gerald Wilson) - 2:57
 "Gongs East" (Chico Hamilton) - 5:04
 "I Gave My Love a Cherry" (Traditional) - 4:03
 "Good Grief, Dennis" (Carlson Smith) - 3:17
 "Long Ago (and Far Away)" (Jerome Kern, Ira Gershwin) - 3:04
 "Tuesday at Two" (Wilson) - 3:59
 "Nature by Emerson" (Fred Katz) - 4:48
 "Far East" (Nat Pierce) - 4:38
 "Passion Flower" (Billy Strayhorn) - 3:04

Personnel
Chico Hamilton - drums, gongs
Eric Dolphy - alto saxophone, bass clarinet, flute 
Nathan Gershman - cello
Dennis Budimir - guitar
Wyatt Ruther - bass

References 

Warner Records albums
Chico Hamilton albums
1959 albums